Kuori is Finnish industrial metal band Ruoska's first album, and was released in 2002.

Track listing
Kuori (2:51) ('Shell')
Koti (3:52) ('Home')
Kiroan (3:55) ('I Curse')
Ruma rakkaus (4:26) ('Ugly Love')
Perkeleet (3:45) ('Devils')
Epilogi (3:41) ('Epilogue')
Propagandaa (4:39) ('Propaganda')
Aurinko ei nouse (4:04) ('The Sun Doesn't Rise')
Armo (3:29) ('Mercy')
Moraoikeus (4:18) ('Knife's Justice')
Suomi lukuina (3:06) ('Finland in Numbers')

Line-up 
During the album recording, these were the band members:
Patrik Mennander (vocals)
Anssi Auvinen (guitar)
Kai Ahvenranta (guitar)
Mika Kamppi (bass)
Sami Karppinen (drums)

Music videos
These are the music videos that were made from songs from this album:
3. Kiroan
6. Epilogi

References
 Kuori at Levykauppax.fi 
 Translated lyrics at Ruiskukka.org

External links
English fansite

Ruoska albums
2002 albums